The Yamaha FJ1100 and FJ1200 are sport touring motorcycles that were produced by  Yamaha between 1984 and 1996.

FJ1100
Yamaha released the FJ1100 for model years 1984 and 1985. The FJ1100 was designed by GK Dynamics. This class is characterised by retaining sportiness while integrating more street-friendly riding characteristics, including good manoeuvrability as well as long-distance comfort, such as a more upright seating configuration designed to reduce back strain and a large fairing to reduce fatigue from wind resistance. Emphasis is placed on a balance of utility and sport, rather than pure performance orientation. 
The machine was noticeably narrower than many contemporaries, Yamaha achieved this by placing the alternator behind the cylinders instead of the more normal position on the end of the crankshaft.

FJ1200
In 1986 Yamaha decided to upgrade the FJ1100 by increasing the engine displacement slightly and adding upgraded suspension and other components. The result was the FJ1200. They also changed the colour choices with the next model, but they weren't significant. The FJ1200 was produced in three main successive versions (1TX, 3CV and 3XW) each updated version benefiting from improvements to bodywork, front and rear suspension components, and the addition of an optional ABS-equipped version (FJ1200A) from 1991 until 1996 when Yamaha discontinued the FJ1200 in the United Kingdom. The model was discontinued in the United States in 1993. Market competitors during its production years included the BMW K100RS, Suzuki's 1100 Katana, and Kawasaki's Ninja ZX-10.

Engine
The FJ1200 uses a four cylinder in-line layout and is air-cooled. Sixteen valves are operated by a chain-driven double overhead camshaft; valve clearances are adjusted using shims. The four constant-velocity carburettors are mounted in a bank behind the cylinders and feed each cylinder through a short intake manifolds.      
Four exhaust downpipes join a box below the engine where the gases are split to exit through two silencers (mufflers). 
The crankshaft is geared directly to the clutch, no counter balancer shaft is used. 
Starting is by electric starter only. Lubrication is wet sump using a trochoid pump; an oil radiator assists with cooling. Both the FJ1100 and FJ1200 were fitted with an additional fuel vapour recovery system to comply with California emission regulations.

Transmission
The FJ1200 uses a five-speed constant-mesh sequential manual close-ratio gearbox.
The clutch is of the wet, multiple-disc diaphragm spring type and is hydraulically operated. Final drive is by O-ring chain and sprockets.

Chassis
The frame of the FJ1200 is manufactured from mild steel box-section and uses a perimeter layout, the fairing and upper rear section use separate cylindrical tubing sub-frames. The rear shock absorber is placed vertically behind the engine and connects to a swinging arm made from extruded aluminium alloy (note: later 3XW models have mild steel swinging arm) via several forged aluminium rocker arms. The 17-inch front wheel is held between 41 mm spring and oil damped forks. The FJ1100 and early FJ1200 models featured adjustable anti-dive units and a smaller diameter 16-inch wheel.
The FJ1100 and early FJ1200 used twin ventilated disc brakes for the front wheel with a single ventilated disc at the rear. FJ1200 models, 3CV & 3XW, used solid front discs but retained the rear ventilated disc, front brake calipers were upgraded to a four-piston design.
An anti-lock braking system was used on the FJ1200A. A full fairing protects the rider, varying height fixed windscreens were available as options.

Electrical system
The FJ1200 features a standard 12 volt electrical system. The alternator and starter motor is mounted behind the cylinders. Nippondenso Transistor Controlled Ignition (TCI) is used in conjunction with two coils. Yamaha's self-cancelling indicator unit is used and a variable resistance gauging system is used to monitor engine oil contents with associated warning lights. A large fuel gauge is provided as is a low fuel level warning light. A digital clock is also fitted. A safety feature of the FJ1200 is that the engine ignition is cut if the first gear is selected with the side-stand down, this is now commonplace on modern motorcycles.

Specifications

See also
List of Yamaha motorcycles

References

Notes

Bibliography

 Ahlstrand, Alan and Haynes, John H. Yamaha FJ1100 & 1200 Fours '84 to '96.  Sparkford, UK: Haynes Publishing,  1996. .
 Clymer, Yamaha FJ1100 & FJ1200 1984-1993. Overland Park, Kansas. Intertec Publishing, second edition 1996. .
 Brown, Roland  The Ultimate History of Fast Bikes.  Bath, UK: Parragon Books, 2004. .

External links

Motorcycle Classics article on the 1984 Yamaha FJ1100

FJ1200
Sport touring motorcycles
Motorcycles introduced in 1984